The rivière au Canard (in English: Duck River) is a watercourse crossing the municipality of Weedon, in the Le Haut-Saint-François Regional County Municipality (MRC), in the administrative region of Estrie, in Quebec, in Canada.

Geography 

The neighboring hydrographic slopes of Lac au Canard are:
 north side: Canard Lake;
 east side: Coulombe River;
 south side: lake Louise, Saint-François River;
 west side: Dufresne stream, Mud stream, Pinard stream, Nicolet River.

The river has its source in Lac au Canard whose mouth is located on the south side.

  towards the south-east, the south-west and the south, collecting the waters of the Dufresne stream (coming from the west), up to the municipal limit between Saint-Joseph-de-Ham-Sud and Weedon;
  southeasterly, along (on the west side) the limit of the Saint-Gérard sector, up to the confluence of the stream Mud (coming from the west);
  towards the south-east, to its mouth.

The Canard River flows into Lake Louise, a lake crossed by the Saint-François River, near Weedon.

Toponymy 
The toponym "Rivière au Canard" was made official on December 5, 1968, at the Commission de toponymie du Québec.

See also 

 Les Appalaches Regional County Municipality
 List of rivers of Quebec

References 

Rivers of Estrie
Le Haut-Saint-François Regional County Municipality